Sir Francis N. Burton was launched in 1825 at Quebec. She was wrecked on 5 December 1826 on a voyage for the British East India Company (EIC).

Sir Francis N. Burton was re-registered at London on 27 May 1826. She first appeared in Lloyd's Register (LR) in 1826 with J.Martin, master, Grayham, owner, and trade London. She had damages repaired in 1826.

In 1813 the EIC had lost its monopoly on the trade between India and Britain. British ships were then free to sail to India or the Indian Ocean under a license from the EIC. "Sir F.N.Burton", J. Martin, master, sailed from England on 1 August 1826 bound for Bengal.

Fate: Sir Francis N. Burton, Martin, master, was wrecked in the Keeling Islands with the loss of three lives. She was on a voyage from the Cape of Good Hope to Bengal. LL reported on 8 October 1827 that  had rescued the master.

Citations

References
 

1825 ships
Ships built in Quebec
Age of Sail merchant ships of England
Maritime incidents in December 1826